Wingate & Finchley Football Club is an English football club based in Finchley in the London Borough of Barnet.

History

The club was established in 1991 by a merger of Wingate and Finchley. Although Finchley were the higher placed of the two clubs, the new club took Wingate's place in the Premier Division of the South Midlands League and played at Finchley's Summers Lane ground, which was renamed after Harry Abrahams, a long time Wingate supporter. In 1994–95 they finished second in the league and joined Division Three of the Isthmian League.

After a second-place finish in 1998–99 they were promoted to Division Two, but were relegated back to Division Three at the end of the following season. After league reorganisation they were placed in Division One North for the 2002–03 season, but in 2004 were transferred to the Eastern Division of the Southern League. The club later returned to Division One North of the Isthmian League. In 2009–10 they finished third, qualifying for the promotion play-offs, in which they lost 3–2 to Enfield Town. The following season the club won the Isthmian League Cup and the London Senior Cup, and finished third again. After beating Harlow Town in the play-off semi-finals, they defeated Brentwood Town 3–2 after extra time in the final, earning promotion to the Premier Division - and securing an historic Treble.

The club finished mid-table in its first season in the Premier Division, before surviving a relegation scare in 2012–13 with one match to spare. In 2013–14, the club were relegated on goal difference behind East Thurrock United despite a final day 5–0 victory. However the drama did not end there, as the resignation of Worksop Town from the Northern Premier League gave Wingate & Finchley a much welcomed reprieve from relegation. The club finished the 2015–16 season in 13th position on 60 points. On 8 October 2018, the club pulled a coup by employing Nicky Shorey and Glen Little as managers. This was short-lived, as Nicky left on 29 October 2018.

Club identity

Wingate & Finchley are often perceived as a 'Jewish club', due to Finchley's sizeable Jewish community and a number of other factors, including sporting the Star of David on the club's badge, having a number of Jews on the committee of the club and being able to apply for special dispensation to move their games should they fall on Yom Kippur. One of Wingate & Finchley's predecessor clubs, Wingate, was established in order to aim to combat anti-semitism. The original Wingate club was named after Orde Wingate, who had been involved in training the Haganah, the precursor to the Israeli Defense Forces.

Fans and rivalries 
Wingate & Finchley have an ultras group called the BlueArmyUltras which was formed in 2016. Attendances are quite low for the league with Wingate only getting an average attendance of 141 in the 2017/18 season.

Wingate & Finchley also have a few rivalries with other clubs. These include Hendon, Enfield Town & Haringey Borough as the bigger rivals and also Harrow Borough, Potters Bar due to their close proximity and competitive similarities. To an even lesser extent, Cockfosters may be considered rivals due to both sides commonly playing each other in the London Senior Cup.

Former British Prime Minister Margaret Thatcher was a patron of Wingate & Finchley and played a key role in the formation of the club. Following her death in 2013, Wingate & Finchley were the only football club in the United Kingdom to hold a minutes silence to mark her passing.

Ground

Wingate & Finchley play their home games at The Maurice Rebak Stadium, Summers Lane, Finchley, London, N12 0PD.

The stadium used to be called Summers Lane when Finchley played there. After the merger it was renamed The Harry Abrahams Stadium after a life-long Wingate fan. In the summer of 2016, the stadium was renamed to its current name, The Maurice Rebak Stadium. It is named after the co-founder who died earlier that year. Wingate and Finchley also have an amazing youth team producing great talented players. They train at the prince Edward Playing fields in Barnet.

Current squad

Records and honours
Record attendance: 528 vs Brentwood Town, Isthmian League Division One North play-off, 2011
Biggest victory: 9–1 vs Winslow United, South Midlands League, 23 November 1991
Heaviest defeat: 0–9 vs Edgware Town, Isthmian League Division Two, 15 January 2000
Most appearances: Marc Morris, 720
Most goals: Marc Morris, 650

As Wingate & Finchley
Isthmian League
League Cup winners 2010–11
London Senior Cup
Winners 1994–95, 2010–11
Runners Up 2004-05

As Finchley FC
Middlesex Senior Cup
Winners 1928–29, 1943–44, 1951–52
London Senior Cup
Winners 1932–33, 1951–52, 1952-53 (Joint holders with Walthamstow Avenue)
Middlesex Charity Cup
Winners 1942–43, 1950–51
Championship London League
Winners 1936-37
London League Challenge Cup
Winners 1934-35
London Intermediate Cup
Winners 1932-33
Middlesex Intermediate Cup
Winners 1932-33
Athenian League
Winners 1953-54

As Wingate FC
Herts County League Division One
Winners 1984-85

References

External links
Club website
Winggate & Finchley @ Soccerway.com

 
Association football clubs established in 1991
Football clubs in England
Football clubs in London
Jewish football clubs
Jews and Judaism in England
Sport in the London Borough of Barnet
South Midlands League
Isthmian League
Southern Football League clubs
1991 establishments in England
Finchley
Diaspora association football clubs in England